Kozia Wola may refer to the following places:
Kozia Wola, Lublin Voivodeship (east Poland)
Kozia Wola, Masovian Voivodeship (east-central Poland)
Kozia Wola, Świętokrzyskie Voivodeship (south-central Poland)